Silvergate may refer to:

 Silvergate Bank, a bank focused on cryptocurrency clients 
 Silvergate Media, a television production and brand licensing company
 Silvergate, Norfolk, a location in England

See also
Silver Gate (disambiguation)